Sumar District is a district (bakhsh) in Qasr-e Shirin County, Kermanshah Province, Iran. At the 2006 census, its population was 247, in 79 families.  The District has one city: Sumar. The district was devastated during the Iran-Iraq War.  The District has one rural district (dehestan): Sumar Rural District.

See also
Boli Rural District

References 

Qasr-e Shirin County
Districts of Kermanshah Province